Colin L. Soskolne is a Canadian epidemiologist and author who was born, raised and educated in South Africa.  He relocated to North America in 1977 to pursue his PhD studies in epidemiology at the University of Pennsylvania, Philadelphia.

References

Canadian epidemiologists
Academic staff of the University of Alberta
Perelman School of Medicine at the University of Pennsylvania alumni
University of the Witwatersrand alumni
Year of birth missing (living people)
Place of birth missing (living people)
Living people